The following is a list of video game podcasts.

List 

| Green Hair Punk'd (independent)

References 

Lists of podcasts
Video game podcasts
Video game lists